"Bless the Night" is the fourth single by Norwegian glam metal band Wig Wam, and it is the third single from Hard to Be a Rock'n Roller, a renamed reissue of their debut album 667.. The Neighbour of the Beast. The whole album was reissued cause of the songs fame. The CD single features the single titletrack and live prefromance of the cover song "Dschingshis Khan" by the band of same name. "Dschingshis Khan" is also one of the three Japan bonus tracks for the Japan reissue of the album.

Track listing

Charts

References 

2005 singles
2005 songs
Wig Wam songs